The Crookes (Persian title: Najoorha- )  is a 1974 Iranian Persian-genre crime film directed by Saied Motallebi and starring Mohammad Ali Fardin, Reza Beyk Imanverdi , Morteza Aghili, Sorayya Hekmat, Ali Azad, Simin Alizadeh, and Ali Miri.

References

1974 films
1970s Persian-language films
1974 crime films
Iranian crime films
Iranian black-and-white films